St. Peter's Institute of Higher Education and Research (SPIHER) is a private deemed to be university located in Paruthipattu in Tiruvallur district, Tamil Nadu. The institution was promoted by the politician M. Thambidurai and managed by his wife.

References

Engineering colleges in Chennai
Academic institutions formerly affiliated with the University of Madras
1993 establishments in Tamil Nadu
Educational institutions established in 1993